The Hills is an American reality television series that originally aired on MTV from May 31, 2006 until July 13, 2010. Developed as the spin-off of Laguna Beach: The Real Orange County, the series aired six seasons and focused on the personal and professional lives of several young women residing in Los Angeles, California. Its premise was originated with Adam DiVello, while Liz Gateley served as the executive producer.

The Hills first season commenced airing on May 31, 2006. The series continued to air on Wednesday evenings until its conclusion on August 2, 2006, at which point it had aired ten episodes. The second season was expanded to twelve episodes and premiered on January 15, 2007, in its new timeslot on Mondays. The finale aired on April 2, 2007. The third season began airing on August 13, 2007, where it remained in the timeslot of the previous season. Initially, the season was to air eighteen episodes, but was later expanded to a total of twenty-eight by its finale on May 12, 2008. The fourth season premiered on August 18, 2008, at which time it was moved back to its original Monday schedule. It consisted of twenty episodes, and concluded on December 22, 2008.

Airing of the fifth season was divided into two sections, Part I under the lead of original narrator Lauren Conrad, and Part II after Kristin Cavallari was confirmed as her replacement. Part I premiered on April 6, 2009 in the same timeslot, and concluded after ten episodes on May 31, 2009. Part II premiered on September 29, 2009 and continued to air on Tuesday evenings. The season aired a total of twenty episodes, each half spawning ten, before finishing on December 1, 2009. The sixth season also aired on Tuesdays and premiered on April 27, 2010. Twelve episodes later, the series ended its run after a total of 102 episodes on July 13, 2010. In July 2012, MTV aired a month-long morning marathon of The Hills, titled "Retro Mania". The following year, the marathon was renamed "RetroMTV Brunch", and culminated with the airing of an alternate series finale ending in August 2013.

Series overview

Episodes

Season 1 (2006)

Season 2 (2007)

Season 3 (2007–08)

Season 4 (2008)

Season 5 (2009)

Season 6 (2010)

References

 
Lists of American reality television series episodes